Sher Sellman is an American politician from Idaho. Sellman is a Republican member of Idaho House of Representatives for District 20, seat B.

Personal life 
Sellman's mother was LaVonne Godschalx (née Nelson)(1917-2010), a teacher and a rancher in Idaho. Sellman's father was William Godschalx (1915-2010), a former Marine and a rancher in Idaho. Sellman has two sisters, Carolyn and Pat. Sellman grew up in Payette County, Idaho.

Career 
Sellman was a high school teacher and than a financial planner.

Sellman served as a city council member for Mountain Home, Idaho.

On November 3, 1998, Sellman won the election and became a Republican member of Idaho House of Representatives for District 20, seat B. Sellman defeated Eric D. Norton with 66.0% of the votes.
On November 7, 2000, as an incumbent, Sellman won the election unopposed and continued serving District 20, seat B.

On November 5, 2002, Sellman sought for a seat in Idaho Senate for District 22 unsuccessfully. Sellman was defeated by Fred Kennedy with 48.9% of the votes. Sell lost by 133 votes. Sellman received 47.2% of the votes.

Personal life 
In 2010, both of Sellman's parents died a few weeks apart.

Sellman's husband is John Sellman. Sellman and her family live in Mountain Home, Idaho.

References 

Living people
Women state legislators in Idaho
Schoolteachers from Idaho
American women educators
Idaho city council members
Republican Party members of the Idaho House of Representatives
People from Mountain Home, Idaho
Year of birth missing (living people)
Women city councillors in Idaho
21st-century American women